Anton Blidh (born 14 March 1995) is a Swedish professional ice hockey forward for the Hartford Wolf Pack of the American Hockey League (AHL) while under contract to the New York Rangers of the National Hockey League (NHL). Blidh was selected by the Boston Bruins in the sixth round (180th overall) of the 2013 NHL Entry Draft.

Playing career

Growing up in Sweden, Blidh split time between the Frolunda U-18 team and Frolunda junior team during the 2012-2013 season. After recording 17 goals and 10 assists in 43 games for the Frolunda junior team, Blidh was drafted in the sixth round, 180th overall, by the Boston Bruins in the 2013 NHL Entry Draft. Following the draft, Blidh made his Swedish Hockey League debut playing with Frölunda HC during the 2013–14 SHL season. He played with the Frölunda HC until 2015, accumulating 10 points through 72 games and 28 penalty minutes. On 29 May 2015, Blidh signed a three-year entry-level contract with the Bruins after appearing in two of their development camps.

Boston Bruins
Upon joining the Bruins organization in North America, Blidh was assigned to their American Hockey League (AHL) affiliate, the Providence Bruins for the 2015–16 season. In his first season with the team, Blidh recorded 10 goals and four assists through 65 games.

The following season, Blidh was re-assigned to the Providence Bruins to begin the 2016–17 season. He played 19 games, producing five goals and four assists in Providence, before being recalled to the NHL level on 2 December 2016. He made his NHL debut the following game in a 2–1 road game win over the Buffalo Sabres, achieving three shots on goal and four hits in his 10:12 of on-ice time. Following this, he scored his first career goal with the Bruins in a home-game loss to the New York Islanders on 20 December 2016. During a game against the Nashville Predators, Blidh recorded a hard hit against Roman Josi which resulted in a major penalty for interference and caused Josi to be placed on injured reserve. Blidh was eventually returned to Providence again on 21 January 2017 after skating in 19 games and posting one goal and one assist with seven penalty minutes.

During the 2017–18 season, Blidh set new career-highs in Providence with 11 goals and 15 assists for 26 points through 71 games. He spent the majority of the season in the AHL, making only one NHL appearance on March 19 against the Columbus Blue Jackets. As a result of his play, Blidh signed a one-year, two-way contract with an NHL cap hit of $650,000. Following the signing, he was again returned to Providence and only played in one NHL game during a 6–3 loss against the Tampa Bay Lightning on 6 April. While in the AHL, he played in 74 games and scored 10 goals and 13 assists for 23 points. On 1 May 2019, Blidh signed a two-year, two-way contract extension with the Bruins.

Blidh appeared in 10 total games for Boston during the shortened 2020–21 season, recording one goal. On 17 July 2021, the Bruins signed Blidh to a one-year, two-way contract with an NHL cap hit of $750,000. In his seventh year with the Bruins in the 2021–22 season, Blidh played the full season in Boston, appearing in a career-high 32 games, recording 2 goals and 9 points in a depth forward role.

Colorado Avalanche
As a free agent from the Bruins, Blidh was signed to a one-year, two-way contract with the Colorado Avalanche, on 3 August 2022. After a successful training camp and pre-season, Blidh made the Avalanche opening season roster for the 2022–23 season. After serving as an healthy scratch, Blidh was re-assigned to begin his year with AHL affiliate, the Colorado Eagles, before shortly returning to the Avalanche and making his debut in a 4–3 overtime defeat to the Winnipeg Jets on 19 October 2022. Blidh went scoreless through 14 games with the Avalanche over the first half of the season before returning to the Eagles.

New York Rangers
On 3 March 2023, Blidh was traded by the Avalanche to the New York Rangers in exchange for fellow Swedish forward Gustav Rydahl.

Career statistics

Regular season and playoffs

International

References

External links
 

1995 births
Living people
Boston Bruins draft picks
Boston Bruins players
Colorado Avalanche players
Colorado Eagles players
Frölunda HC players
Hartford Wolf Pack players
Karlskrona HK players
People from Härryda Municipality
Providence Bruins players
Sportspeople from Västra Götaland County
Swedish ice hockey forwards